The University of Navojoa (Spanish, Universidad de Navojoa) is a Seventh-day Adventist institution of higher learning located in Navojoa, Sonora, Mexico.  The University confers degrees in religion, education, nutrition and business. The university offers a Masters of Business Administration (MBA).

It is a part of the Seventh-day Adventist education system, the world's second largest Christian school system.

See also

 List of Seventh-day Adventist colleges and universities
 Seventh-day Adventist education

References

External links
 Official website

Private universities and colleges in Mexico
Universities and colleges in Sonora
Universities and colleges affiliated with the Seventh-day Adventist Church